The 2022 SGB Championship season is the 75th season of the second tier of British Speedway and the 5th known as the SGB Championship.

Summary
Eleven clubs competed in the Championship in 2022, with Oxford returning to the sport after a 15 year absence. The Eastbourne Eagles and the Kent Kings did not compete in the 2022 edition, with the Kings riding in the National Development League as The Royals, and Eastbourne not riding at all.

Alongside the league and Knockout Cup, a new Summer competition was added in form of a group stage before a three team final at Sheffield. The tournament was called 'The Championship Jubilee League' which was eventually suspended until the 2023 season. However the additional fixtures created an issue due to the suspension of fixtures during the Death and state funeral of Elizabeth II and the heavy rain during October. In retrospect an additional event could have been added after the completion of the league and cup fixtures. Poole Pirates dominated the season again and successfully defended their league and knockout cup double crown.

Newcastle withdrew from the Championship and closed their doors on June 21. Their results were expunged from the League and they were withdrawn from the Knockout Cup and Jubilee League.

League

Regular Season
League Table

NOTE: Newcastle’s results were expunged from the table on 28-06-22 following their withdrawal from the 2022 Championship.

(SF) = Qualification for the League Play-off Semi Finals
(QF) = Qualification for the League Play-off Quarter Finals

Fixtures & Results

League Scoring System
Home loss by any number of points = 0
Home draw = 1
Home win by any number of points = 3
Away loss by 7 points or more = 0
Away loss by 6 points or less = 1
Away draw = 2
Away win by between 1 and 6 points = 3
Away win by 7 points or more = 4

Play-offs

Home team scores are in bold
Overall aggregate scores are in red

Grand Final
First Leg

Second Leg

Knockout Cup
The 2022 SGB Championship Knockout Cup was the 54th edition of the Knockout Cup for tier two teams and the 5th edition under the SGB Championship Knockout Cup name.

Bracket

{{16TeamBracket|legs=2|aggregate=y
|RD1=Round One
|RD2=Quarter Finals
|RD3=Semi Finals
|RD4=Final
|group1=
|group2=
|group3=
|group4=
|RD1-seed01=
|RD1-team01= Newcastle Diamonds
|RD1-score01-1= 41
|RD1-score01-2= 32
|RD1-score01-agg= 73
|RD1-seed02=
|RD1-team02= Edinburgh Monarchs
|RD1-score02-1= 49
|RD1-score02-2= 58
|RD1-score02-agg= 107
|RD1-seed03=
|RD1-team03= Glasgow Tigers
|RD1-score03-1=
|RD1-score03-2=
|RD1-score03-agg=
|RD1-seed04=
|RD1-team04= Bye
|RD1-score04-1=
|RD1-score04-2=
|RD1-seed05=
|RD1-team05= Oxford Cheetahs
|RD1-score05-1= 47
|RD1-score05-2= 39
|RD1-score05-agg=86
|RD1-seed06=
|RD1-team06= Redcar Bears
|RD1-score06-1= 43
|RD1-score06-2= 51
|RD1-score06-agg=94
|RD1-seed07=
|RD1-team07= Berwick Bandits
|RD1-score07-1=
|RD1-score07-2=
|RD1-score07-agg=
|RD1-seed08=
|RD1-team08= Bye
|RD1-score08-1=
|RD1-score08-2=
|RD1-score08-agg=
|RD1-seed09=
|RD1-team09= Plymouth Gladiators
|RD1-score09-1=
|RD1-score09-2=
|RD1-score09-agg=
|RD1-seed10=
|RD1-team10= Bye
|RD1-score10-1=
|RD1-score10-2=
|RD1-score10-agg=
|RD1-score10
|RD1-seed11=
|RD1-team11= Poole Pirates
|RD1-score11-1=
|RD1-score11-2=
|RD1-score11-agg=
|RD1-seed12=
|RD1-team12= Bye
|RD1-score12-1=
|RD1-score12-2=
|RD1-score12-agg=
|RD1-seed13=
|RD1-team13= Leicester Lions
|RD1-score13-1= 64
|RD1-score13-2= 30
|RD1-score13-agg=94
|RD1-seed14=
|RD1-team14= Birmingham Brummies
|RD1-score14-1= 26
|RD1-score14-2= 30
|RD1-score14-agg=56
|RD1-seed15=
|RD1-team15= Scunthorpe Scorpions
|RD1-score15-1=
|RD1-score15-2=
|RD1-score15-agg=
|RD1-seed16=
|RD1-team16= Bye
|RD1-score16-1=
|RD1-score16-2=
|RD1-score16-agg=

|RD2-seed01=
|RD2-team01= Edinburgh Monarchs
|RD2-score01-1=53
|RD2-score01-2=37
|RD2-score01-agg=91
|RD2-seed02=
|RD2-team02= Glasgow Tigers
|RD2-score02-1=32
|RD2-score02-2=52
|RD2-score02-agg=89
|RD2-seed03=
|RD2-team03= Redcar Bears
|RD2-score03-1=51
|RD2-score03-2=56
|RD2-score03-agg=107
|RD2-seed04=
|RD2-team04= Berwick Bandits
|RD2-score04-1=39
|RD2-score04-2=34
|RD2-score04-agg=73
|RD2-seed05=
|RD2-team05= Plymouth Gladiators
|RD2-score05-1='42
|RD2-score05-2=32
|RD2-score05-agg=74
|RD2-seed06=
|RD2-team06= Poole Pirates
|RD2-score06-1=48
|RD2-score06-2=58|RD2-score06-agg=106
|RD2-seed07=
|RD2-team07= Leicester Lions|RD2-score07-1= 58|RD2-score07-2= 45
|RD2-score07-agg=101
|RD2-seed08=
|RD2-team08= Scunthorpe Scorpions
|RD2-score08-1= 32
|RD2-score08-2= 45|RD2-score08-agg=77

|RD3-team01= Edinburgh Monarchs
|RD3-seed01=
|RD3-score01-1= 47|RD3-score01-2= 35
|RD3-score01-agg=83
|RD3-team02= Redcar Bears|RD3-seed02=
|RD3-score02-1= 43
|RD3-score02-2= 54|RD3-score02-agg=97
|RD3-team03=  Poole Pirates|RD3-seed03= 
|RD3-score03-1= 44
|RD3-score03-2= 60|RD3-score03-agg=104
|RD3-team04= Leicester Lions
|RD3-seed04= 
|RD3-score04-1= 46|RD3-score04-2= 30
|RD3-score04-agg=76

|RD4-team01= Redcar Bears
|RD4-seed01=
|RD4-score01-1=41|RD4-score01-2= 38
|RD4-score01-agg=79
|RD4-team02= Poole Pirates|RD4-seed02=
|RD4-score02-1= 48
|RD4-score02-2= 52|RD4-score02-agg=100
}}
Home team scores are in boldOverall aggregate scores are in red

FinalFirst LegSecond LegJubilee League

Group stageScottish GroupFixturesTable{| class="wikitable" style="text-align:center; font-size:85%"
! rowspan="2" style="width:28px;"| 
!rowspan=2| Club
! rowspan="2" style="width:28px;"| 
!colspan=3| Home
!colspan=5| Away
! rowspan="2" style="width:28px;"| 
! rowspan="2" style="width:28px;"| 
! rowspan="2" style="width:28px;"| 
! rowspan="2" style="width:28px;"| 
|-
!width=28| 
!width=28| 
!width=28| 
!width=28| 
!width=28| 
!width=28| 
!width=28| 
!width=28| 
|- style="background:#ACE1AF"
! 1
|align=left| Glasgow Tigers (Q)
| 4
| 2
| 0
| 0
| 0
| 1
| 0
| 0
| 1
| 204
| 153
| 9
| +51
|- 
! 2
|align=left| Edinburgh Monarchs 
| 4
| 2
| 0
| 0
| 0
| 1
| 0
| 0
| 1
| 184
| 176
| 9
| +8
|- 
! 3
|align=left| Berwick Bandits 
| 4
| 0
| 0
| 2
| 0
| 0
| 0
| 0
| 2
| 149
| 208
| 0
| -49
|}

Northern Group

Fixtures

Table

Southern Group

Fixtures

Table

Final
The three group winners were supposed to have met in a three-leg final, with each side hosting a leg. However, following the death of the Queen, the competition was initially suspended and then following fixture congestion and weather problems it was decided to hold the final the following season. The decision to hold the final seemed odd because Glasgow had pulled out and Leicester had moved leagues.

Pairs Championship
The 2022 edition of the SGB Championship Pairs Championship took place on Friday 12 August, at Oxford Stadium, Oxford.

Result

Semi Finals

Final

Riders Championship
The 2022 edition of the SGB Championship Riders Championship took place on Wednesday 24 August , at Poole Stadium, Poole.

Leading averages
Final Averages - SGB Championship, Knockout Cup, Jubilee League and Play-Off Matches only.

Squads & final averages

Berwick Bandits
 (C) 8.98
 7.05
 6.76
 6.61
 6.59
 5.52
 4.97
 2.63
 2.22

Birmingham Brummies
 8.13
 7.34
 5.85
 5.48
 (C) 5.38
 5.06
 3.76
 2.94

Edinburgh Monarchs
 (C) 10.15
 9.34
 7.10
 6.25
 4.42
 4.19
 3.21

Glasgow Tigers
 (C) 8.98
 8.30
 7.42
 7.40
 6.55
 5.93
 5.55

Leicester Lions
 9.06
 (C) 9.02
 8.87
 6.27
 5.63
 5.51
 5.00
 4.68

Oxford Cheetahs
 (C) 8.62
 8.39
 7.82
 5.60
 5.52
 5.28
 5.26
 2.00
 0.40

Plymouth Gladiators
 8.89
 (C) 7.70
 7.41
 6.59
 5.75
 4.91
 4.81
 2.95
 2.86
 0.86

Poole Pirates
 9.92
 (C) 9.08
 8.98
 7.59
 7.13
 5.96
 1.95

Redcar Bears
 8.95
 (C) 8.73
 7.95
 6.00
 5.72
 5.34
 4.67
 1.80

Scunthorpe Scorpions
 9.85
 7.20
 7.09
 6.29
 (C) 5.88
 5.86
 5.47
 5.36
 4.35
 2.62

See also
List of United Kingdom speedway league champions
Knockout Cup (speedway)

References

SGB Championship
SGB Championship
SGB Championship